List of birds of Washington may refer to:

 List of birds of Washington (state)
 List of birds of Washington, D.C.